Piotr Ruszkul (born 4 August 1985) is a Polish former professional footballer who played as a forward.

External links
 

1985 births
Living people
Polish footballers
Amica Wronki players
Górnik Zabrze players
Stilon Gorzów Wielkopolski players
OKS Stomil Olsztyn players
Unia Janikowo players
Olimpia Grudziądz players
Wisła Płock players
Wigry Suwałki players
Bałtyk Gdynia players
Ekstraklasa players
I liga players
II liga players
III liga players
People from Kętrzyn
Sportspeople from Warmian-Masurian Voivodeship
Association football forwards